Guttaviridae is a family of viruses. Archaea serve as natural hosts. There are two genera in this family, containing one species each. The name is derived from the Latin gutta, meaning 'droplet'.

Taxonomy
The family contains the following genera and species:
 Alphaguttavirus
 Sulfolobus newzealandicus droplet-shaped virus
 Betaguttavirus
 Aeropyrum pernix ovoid virus 1

Structure
Viruses in the family Guttaviridae are enveloped. The diameter is around 70–95 nm, with a length of 110–185 nm. Genomes are circular, around 20kb in length. The virons consist of a coat, a core, a nucleocapsid, and projecting fibers at the pointed end. The surface of the virion has a beehive-like ribbed surface pattern with protrusions that are densely covered by a 'beard' of long fibers at its pointed end. The genome is extremely heavily methylated.

Life cycle
DNA-templated transcription is the method of transcription. Archaea serve as the natural host.

References

External links

 ICTV Online Report Guttaviridae
 Viralzone: Guttaviridae
 Viralzone: Alphaguttavirus
 Viralzone: Betaguttavirus

 
Archaeal viruses
Virus families